Events in the year 1894 in Bulgaria.

Incumbents

Events 

 23 September – Parliamentary elections were held in the country. Voter turnout was unusually high.

References 

 
1890s in Bulgaria
Years of the 20th century in Bulgaria
Bulgaria
Bulgaria